James Fenner (2 June 1801 – 1841) was an English first-class cricketer who played for the Cambridge Town Club in one match in 1821, totalling 2 runs with a highest score of 2.

He was baptised James Fenner at All Saints in the Jewry, Cambridge on 1 November 1801. The parents are recorded as Joseph and Sarah Fenner.

References

Bibliography
 

English cricketers
English cricketers of 1787 to 1825
Cambridge Town Club cricketers
1801 births
1841 deaths